is the 13th single by Japanese girl group SKE48, released in Japan on November 20, 2013.

Track listing

TYPE-A

TYPE-B

TYPE-C

TYPE-D

Theater Edition

Personnel

"Sansei Kawaii!" 
Center: Jurina Matsui, Rena Matsui
 Team S: Anna Ishida, Masana Ōya, Yuria Kizaki, Yūka Nakanishi, Jurina Matsui, Manatsu Mukaida
 Team KII: Mina Ōba, Aya Shibata, Akari Suda, Akane Takayanagi, Airi Furukawa
 Team E: Kanon Kimoto, Nanako Suga, Nao Furuhata, Rena Matsui
 Kenkyūsei: Ryoha Kitagawa

"Koko de Ippatsu" 
Performed by Dasu & Tsuma
 Team KII: Akari Suda
 Kenkyūsei: Kaori Matsumura

"Michi wa Naze Tsuzuku no ka?" 
Performed by Aichi Toyota Senbatsu
 Team S: Masana Ōya, Yuria Kizaki, Jurina Matsui, Manatsu Mukaida
 Team KII: Aya Shibata, Akari Suda, Akane Takayanagi, Airi Furukawa
 Team E: Kanon Kimoto, Nao Furuhata, Rena Matsui
 Kenkyūusei: Kitagawa Ryōha

"Zutto Zutto Saki no Kyou" 
Performed by Selection 18
 Team S: Kyoka Isohara, Masana Ōya, Yuria Kizaki, Makiko Saitō, Yūka Nakanishi, Jurina Matsui
 Team KII: Mina Ōba, Ami Kobayashi, Aya Shibata, Akari Suda, Akane Takayanagi, Airi Furukawa, Rina Matsumoto
 Team E: Madoka Umemoto, Shiori Kaneko, Kanon Kimoto, Rena Matsui
 Kenkyūsei: Matsumura Kaori

"Itsunomanika, Yowaimonoijime" 
Performed by Selection 8
 Team S: Yuna Ego, Niidoi Sayaka
 Team KII: Futamura Haruka
 Team E: Rion Azuma, Ichino Narumi, Iwanaga Tsugumi, Mizuno Honoka, Miyamae Ami

"Canaria Syndrome" 
Performed by Shirogumi
 Team S: Riho Abiru, Kyoka Isohara, Risako Gotō, Makiko Saitō, Rika Tsuzuki
 Team KII: Mikoto Uchiyama, Tomoko Katō, Ami Kobayashi, Mieko Satō, Rina Matsumoto
 Team E: Mei Sakai, Reika Yamada
 Kenkyūsei: Asana Inuzuka, Risa Ogino, Ruka Kitano, Yuna Kitahara

"Zakuro no Miwa Yuutsu ga Nantsubu Tsumatte Iru?" 
Performed by Akagumi
 Team S: Seira Satō, Aki Deguchi, Miki Yakata
 Team KII: Rumi Katō, Yumana Takagi, Mai Takeuchi, Yukari Yamashita, Mizuho Yamada
 Team E: Shiori Iguchi, Madoka Umemoto, Shiori Kaneko, Momona Kito, Yukiko Kinoshita
 Kenkyūsei: Shiori Aoki, Arisa Ōwaki, Haruka Kumazaki

Charts

Billboard charts

Oricon charts

Release history

References
Releases

Other references

External links 

2013 singles
Japanese-language songs
Songs with lyrics by Yasushi Akimoto
SKE48 songs
Avex Trax singles
2013 songs